George Cummings (born 1938) is an American guitarist and songwriter.

George Cummings may also refer to:

 George Cummings (cricketer) (1882–1943), New Zealand cricketer
 George Cummings (footballer) (1913–1987), Scottish footballer

See also
 George Cumming (golfer) (1879–1950), Scottish-Canadian golfer and club maker
 George Cumming (politician) (1752–1834), Scottish politician
 George Cummins (disambiguation), multiple people